Mary Stevens may refer to:
 Mary Stevens, M.D., a 1933 American pre-Code drama film
 Mary Otis Stevens, American architect

See also
 MaryAnne Stevens, British art historian and curator